Tracey Porter is an American children's book author.  She writes novels targeted towards children aged 9 to 12. Her novel Billy Creekmore was named in Oprah.com's Kids' Reading List, compiled by the American Library Association. She is a middle-school teacher at Crossroads School in Santa Monica, California.

Books
 Treasures in the Dust, 1999, 
 A Dance of Sisters, 2002, 
 Billy Creekmore, 2007, 
 Lark, 2011,

External links
 Official website from HarperCollins(traceyporterbooks.com) 
  

American children's writers
Living people
Year of birth missing (living people)
Place of birth missing (living people)
American women children's writers
21st-century American women